Yugh (Yug) is a Yeniseian language, closely related to Ket, formerly spoken by the Yugh people, one of the southern groups along the Yenisei River in central Siberia. 
It was once regarded as a dialect of the Ket language, which was considered to be a language isolate, and was therefore called Sym Ket or Southern Ket; however, the Ket considered it to be a distinct language. By the early 1990s there were only two or three non-fluent speakers remaining, and the language was virtually extinct. In the 2010 census only one ethnic Yugh was counted.

Notes

References
Vajda, Edward J., Yeniseian Peoples and Languages : A History of Yeniseian Studies with an Annotated Bibliography and a Source Guide, Curzon Press: 2002 .

External links
 Yugh basic lexicon at the Global Lexicostatistical Database

Extinct languages of Asia
Languages of Russia
Yeniseian languages
Languages extinct in the 20th century